Théâtre Antoine-Simone Berriau is a theater located at 14 boulevard de Strasbourg in the 10th arrondissement of Paris.

The 800-seat Italian Style theater was built in the year 1866.  It functioned under a variety of names through the years, opening as Theatre des Menus-Plaisirs (1866–1874, 1877–1879, 1882–1888), then Théâtre des Arts (1874–1876, 1879–1881), Opéra-Bouffe (1876–1877), and the Comédie-Parisienne (1881).

Théâtre-Libre (1888-1897) and Théâtre-Antoine (1897-1906)
In 1888 it became the venue for the Théâtre Libre company of André Antoine.  Although short-lived, lasting only eight years, the theater's pioneering naturalism proved extremely influential.  Antoine departed in 1894 under financial pressure, the enterprise closed in 1896, but Antoine returned the following year to the renamed Théâtre Antoine with a more deliberately provocative program that lasted until 1906.

From 1943 onwards
The theater now bears the name of actress and director Simone Berriau, who presented the complete dramatic work of Jean-Paul Sartre here beginning in 1943.  For instance the first production of his 1951 The Devil and the Good Lord opened here, directed by Louis Jouvet.  On her death in 1984 her daughter Helena Bossis took charge; since the death of Bossis in 2008, her husband Daniel Dares has served as director.

Premieres

Théâtre des Menus-Plaisirs

1867: Geneviève de Brabant (revised version) by Jacques Offenbach
1883: Les pommes d'or by Edmond Audran
1887: La fiancée des Verts-Poteaux by Audran
1891: L'oncle Célestin by Audran
1892: Article de Paris by Audran

References

External links

 Official website

Antoine
Antoine
Theatres completed in 1866
1866 establishments in France